Leigh College was from 1915  until 1974 a Methodist Theological College located at 416-420 Liverpool Road, Strathfield South, New South Wales. It was the successor to Wesleyan Theological Institution. The site includes three significant historic properties: Brundah, a Victorian style house, Leigh College Hall, a neo-Georgian Revival style building and the E. Vickery Memorial Chapel.

History
Brundah, an Italianate style house, was built on the site in the mid-1880s for a wine merchant, Thomas Alt.  The house was home to the Alt family until 1911 and then was owned by Paul Lamarand. In 1915, the Methodist Church purchased the house and grounds and moved its theological students from Stanmore where they had shared the grounds of Newington College. The new college was named in honour of the Wesleyan missionary Samuel Leigh. In 1927, the foundation stone for a new building was laid by the Sir Dudley de Chair. The new Leigh College was opened in 1928 to a design by Byera Hadley. Hadley also designed a chapel that was built in honour of the Hon. Ebenezer Vickery MLC. The site became the home of the United Theological College, a part of the theology school at Charles Sturt University, in 1974 with the union of Leigh College (Methodist), Camden College (Congregational Union of Australia) and St. Andrews College (Presbyterian Church). The new Uniting Church college moved in 1987 and the land was sub-divided. The site became the home of Noor Al Houda Islamic College and is now the Australian International Academy.

Heritage listings
The Memorial Chapel and Leigh Hall are listed on the Royal Australian Institute of Architects (NSW Chapter) Register of Twentieth Century Buildings of Significance and with Brundah are classified by the National Trust of Australia (NSW). The College site, including front and rear grounds, is also contained in the National Trust's Strathfield Urban Conservation Area Precinct 3.

References

1915 establishments in Australia
Universities in New South Wales
Defunct universities and colleges in Australia
Educational institutions established in 1915
Education in Sydney
Education in New South Wales
Methodism in Australia
Methodist seminaries and theological colleges
Seminaries and theological colleges in New South Wales
Municipality of Strathfield